Abdur Rahim Quazi, is an Indian politician. He is a member of All India Trinamool Congress. In May 2021, he was elected as MLA of West Bengal Legislative Assembly from the Baduria (Vidhan Sabha constituency).

References 

Living people
People from Purulia district
Year of birth missing (living people)
West Bengal MLAs 2016–2021
West Bengal MLAs 2021–2026